Augustin may refer to:

 Augustin (name), male name, variant of Augustine 
 Augustin (typography), English or 14-point type
 Augustin, Brașov, a commune in Brașov County, Romania
 Dacian fortress of Augustin, ruined Dacian fortified town in modern Romania
 Palace of Augustin, a palace in Vitoria, Spain

Film

 Augustin (film), a 1995 French film
 Augustin, King of Kung-Fu, 1999 French movie

Music

 O du lieber Augustin ("Oh, you dear Augustin"), a popular Viennese song
 "Augustin" (song), Sweden's 1959 Eurovision Song Contest entry

See also 

 Augustine (disambiguation)
 Agustin